Rural Municipality of Cartier is a rural municipality in the Central Plains and Metro Regions of Manitoba, Canada. The municipality is bordered on the west by the RM of Portage la Prairie, to the east by the RM of Headingley, and to the north by the Assiniboine River. It is mainly flat rich farmland. Its main town is Elie.

It is named after Sir George-Étienne Cartier who was a leader in bringing Quebec into Confederation. Until 1914, it was part of the larger municipality of St. François Xavier.

Water 
The Cartier Regional Water Co-op manages the water supply in the rural municipality as well as other nearby RMs such as Headingley, Rosser, and Macdonald. The Cartier Water Treatment Plant brings in water from the Assiniboine River where it is cleaned of silt and debris and other toxins and distributed within the RM and also sent out to other nearby communities.

Communities
 Dacotah
 Elie
 St. Eustache
 Springstein
 White Plains

Demographics 

References

 Manitoba Historical Society - Rural Municipality of Cartier
Community Profile - Statistics Canada
 Map of Cartier R.M. at Statcan

External links
 Official website

Cartier
Cartier
Cartier